Note: For information on the transcription used, see National Library at Calcutta romanization. Exception from the standard are the romanization of Sinhala long "ä" as "ää", and the non-marking of prenasalized stops.

Sinhala words of English origin mainly came about during the period of British colonial rule in Sri Lanka. This period saw absorption of several English words into the local language brought about by the interaction between the English and Sinhala languages. 

These are examples of Sinhala words of English origin

See also
 Sinhala language
 Dutch loanwords in Sinhala
 Portuguese loanwords in Sinhala
 Tamil loanwords in Sinhala

References
Impact of English loan words in Sinhala

English